Edvard Šoštarič (25 November 1941 – 1 September 2011) was a Yugoslav football referee from Slovenia. He is best known for having been selected as one of 22 referees to officiate in the 1984 Olympics football tournament, where he supervised the group match between Morocco and Saudi Arabia played at the Rose Bowl stadium in Pasadena.

References
FIFA Profile
Obituary 

1941 births
2011 deaths
Slovenian football referees
Place of birth missing
Yugoslav football referees
Olympic football referees